Ghalib ibn Fihr, is counted among the direct ancestors of the Islamic prophet Muhammad.  In the lineage of Muhammad from Adnan, Fihr precedes Muhammad by ten generations. He is the son of Fihr ibn Malik who lived in Makkah. He died and was buried in Makkah, which was also his birth place.

History 
It is said that Muhammad's lineage is:

Muhammad bin Abdullah bin Abdul Muttalib (Shayba) bin Hashim (Amr ul-Ula) bin Abd Manaf (Al-Mughirah) bin Qusay (Zayd) bin Kilab bin Murrah bin Ka'b bin Lu'ay bin Ghalib bin Fihr (Al-Qarish) bin Malik bin An Nadr (Qays) bin Kinanah bin Khuzaymah bin Mudrikah (Amir) bin Ilyas bin Mudar bin Nizar bin Ma'ad bin Adnan bin Add bin Udad bin Humaysi bin Hamayda bin Salaman bin Thalabah bin Bura bin Shuha bin Yarbah bin Kasdana bin Awwam bin Nashid bin Muqawwam bin Muhtamil bin Badlana bin Ayqan bin Alaha bin Shahdud bin Makhai bin Ayfa bin Aqir bin Al Da'a bin Abdai bin Hamdan bin Bashmani bin Bathrani bin Bahrani bin Anud bin Ra'wani bin Aqara bin Dayshan bin Naydawan bin Ayyamah bin Bahami bin Hisn bin Nizal bin Qumayr bin Mujashshir bin Mazzi bin Adwa bin Arram bin Qaydar bin Ismail bin Ibrahim, the Friend of God.

References

Year of birth missing
Year of death missing
Ancestors of Muhammad
3rd-century Arabs
Quraysh